Turbonilla mirifica is a species of sea snail, a marine gastropod mollusk in the family Pyramidellidae, the pyrams and their allies.

Description
The length of the shell varies between 3.1 mm and 4.8 mm.

Distribution
This species occurs in the following locations:
 European waters from NW France to Morocco
 Mediterranean Sea (Sicily)

References

External links
 To Biodiversity Heritage Library (1 publication)
 To CLEMAM
 To Encyclopedia of Life
 To World Register of Marine Species
 

mirifica
Gastropods described in 1904